This article refers to the Moscow government team formed in 2004. For the predecessors in the Russian Premier League, see FC Torpedo-ZIL and FC Torpedo-Metallurg.

FC Moscow (Russian: Футбольный клуб Москва) was a Russian football club based in Moscow.

History
The creation of the team was first announced by the Moscow government on 1 March 2004. FC Moscow was formed on the base of FC Torpedo-Metallurg. The team played in the Russian Cup final in 2007.

Moscow's best result in Russian Premier League was a 4th position in 2007.

On 14 December 2007, Oleg Blokhin was announced as FC Moscow's new manager with Leonid Slutsky having left at the end of the 2007 season.
In February 2010 the club withdrew from the Premier League after their owner and main sponsor, MMC Norilsk Nickel, withdrew funding. Their place in the league was taken by Alania Vladikavkaz. Subsequently FC Moscow folded, ceasing to exist as a professional football club. They played in 2010 in the fourth level of the Russian football pyramid, the Amateur Football League, and after that season the team was dissolved altogether on 28 December. Soon after the club was reestablished and continue to compete in the Amateur Football League.

During the professional period, E. Streltsov Stadium, in Moscow was used as home ground.

Domestic history

European history
FC Moscow in its first appearance on the European arena reached the third round of 2006 Intertoto Cup and was eliminated by Hertha BSC Berlin.
FC Moscow made their second appearance in Europe in the 2008–09 UEFA Cup, beating Legia Warsaw in the qualifying round.

Nicknames
Fans and journalists call FC Moskva The Citizens. The colloquial nickname for the club is The Caps, which refers to Moscow government ownership (former Moscow mayor Yuriy Luzhkov usually wears a cap).

Notable players
Had international caps for their respective countries. Players whose name is listed in bold represented their countries while playing for FC Moscow/Torpedo-ZIL/Torpedo-Metallurg.

USSR/Russia
   Dmitri Kuznetsov
   Oleg Sergeyev
  Aleksandr Borodyuk
  Sergei Gorlukovich
 Sergey Shustikov
  Dmitri Khlestov
 Roman Adamov
 Dimitri Ananko
 Aleksei Arifullin
 Aleksei Berezutski
 Vasili Berezutski
 Pyotr Bystrov
 Aleksandr Filimonov
 Dmitri Kirichenko
 Oleg Kornaukhov
 Oleg Kuzmin
 Vladimir Lebed
 Kirill Nababkin
 Andrei Novosadov
 Nikolai Pisarev
 Sergei Podpaly
 Aleksei Rebko
 Aleksandr Ryazantsev
 Aleksandr Samedov
 Aleksandr Sheshukov
 Sergei Semak
 Roman Shirokov
 Dmitri Tarasov
Former Socialist Republic countries
 Sargis Hovsepyan

 Yervand Krbachyan
 Andrey Movsisyan
 Emin Agaev
 Vyaçeslav Lıçkin
 Narvik Sirkhayev
 Anton Amelchenko
 Barys Haravoy
 Vladimir Korytko
 Andrei Ostrovskiy
 Syarhey Yaskovich
 Yuri Zhevnov
 Gia Grigalava
 Mikheil Jishkariani
 Alexander Rekhviashvili
 Ruslan Baltiev
 Evgeniy Lovchev
 Alexandru Curtianu
 Alexandru Epureanu
 Stanislav Ivanov
 Alexandru Popovici
 Radu Rebeja
 Oleg Shirinbekov
 Yuri Moroz
 Oleksandr Pomazun
 Bakhtiyor Ashurmatov
 Ulugbek Bakayev

Europe
 Ricardo Baiano
 Miro Katić
 Branislav Krunić

 Munever Rizvić
 Roman Hubník
 Vladimirs Koļesņičenko
 Andris Vaņins
 Edgaras Česnauskis
 Ignas Dedura
 Rolandas Džiaukštas
 Tadas Gražiūnas
 Saulius Mikalajūnas
 Irmantas Stumbrys
 Giedrius Žutautas
 Goran Maznov
 Damian Gorawski
 Mariusz Jop
 Pompiliu Stoica
 Zvonimir Vukić
 Martin Jakubko
 Amir Karič
 Branko Ilič
 Jonas Wallerstedt

South America
 Pablo Barrientos 
 Héctor Bracamonte
 Maxi López
 Maximiliano Moralez

Africa
 Jerry-Christian Tchuissé
 Baba Adamu
 Isaac Okoronkwo
 Stanton Fredericks

Managers
Information correct as of match played 29 November 2009. Only competitive matches are counted.

Notes:

Club records

Top goalscorers

Most appearances

References

External links
http://www.fcmoscow.ru  – Official website 

 
Association football clubs established in 2004
Association football clubs disestablished in 2010
Defunct football clubs in Moscow
2004 establishments in Russia
2010 disestablishments in Russia